Hathidah Junction station code HTZ, is a railway station in Danapur division of East Central Railway.  Hathidah is connected to metropolitan areas of India, by the Delhi–Kolkata main line via Mugalsarai–Patna route. Hathidah is located in Mokama city in Patna district in the Indian state of Bihar. Due to its location on the Howrah–Patna–Mughalsarai main line many Patna, Barauni bound express trains coming from Howrah, Sealdah, Ranchi, Tatanagar stop here.
It also has an upper station, Hathidah Upper, station code HTZU (1 PF) which diverges from the Delhi–Kolkata main line at Rampur Dumra Junction. The station passes from above the main Lower Junction. The line comes from Asansol-Kiul and goes towards Barauni Junction and New Barauni Junction. The Hathidah Upper - Barauni line goes through the Rajendra Setu over the river Ganga.

Platforms

It has three platforms that are interconnected with foot overbridge (FOB).

References

External links 
 Official website of the Patna district

Railway stations in Patna district
Railway junction stations in Bihar
Danapur railway division